Zaypekul (Zäypekül) is a rural locality (a village) in Karanovsky Selsoviet, Miyakinsky District, Bashkortostan, Russia. The population was 46 as of 2010. There are 2 streets.

Geography 
Zaypekul is located 32 km northeast of Kirgiz-Miyaki (the district's administrative centre) by road. Sofiyevka is the nearest rural locality.

References 

Rural localities in Miyakinsky District